Brush Run is a  long 1st order tributary to Buffalo Creek in Washington County, Pennsylvania.

Course
Brush Run rises about 3 miles east of Buffalo, Pennsylvania, in Washington County and then flows west-southwest to join Buffalo Creek at Acheson.

Watershed
Brush Run drains  of area, receives about 39.9 in/year of precipitation, has a wetness index of 323.39, and is about 40% forested.

See also
List of Pennsylvania Rivers

References

Rivers of Pennsylvania
Rivers of Washington County, Pennsylvania